Pertti Ahti Olavi Kärkkäinen (3 April 1933 – 10 January 2017) was a Finnish diplomat. He was born in Viipuri and held a Bachelor of Political Science degree. He served as Finnish Ambassador to  Jakarta (Indonesia)  from 1982 to 1985, and to Kuala Lumpur (Malaysia) 1983–1985 and to Buenos Aires (Argentina) from  1988 to 1993,  and to Santiago (Chile) from 1988 to 1991 and to Lima (Peru) from 1991 to 1993.

Pertti Kärkkäinen was also an active radio amateur from 1952. His calling signs were OH2MT and OH3GQ. He died, aged 83, in Helsinki.

References 

Ambassadors of Finland to Indonesia
Ambassadors of Finland to Malaysia
Ambassadors of Finland to Argentina
Ambassadors of Finland to Chile
Ambassadors of Finland to Peru
1933 births
2017 deaths
Diplomats from Vyborg
Amateur radio people